Impeccability is the absence of sin.  Christianity teaches this to be an attribute of God (logically God cannot sin: it would mean that he would act against his own will and nature) and therefore it is also attributed to Christ.

Roman Catholic teaching

Impeccability and Heaven 
Early Christians questioned whether the victorious saints in heaven could sin. The widely influential Eastern Church Father and theologian Origen of Alexandria maintained that they could. Official Roman Catholic doctrine holds that they cannot. Although Catholics believe in the gift of free will, saints in heaven already see God face to face and are incapable of sinning (see Pope Benedict XII and beatific vision), i.e., they will necessarily remain in God. The Catechism of the Catholic Church states (emphasis added):

Impeccability and Purgatory 
The 13th-century, Dominican theologian Thomas Aquinas taught that souls in Purgatory cannot sin (Summa Theologica, Second Part of the Second Part, Question 83, Article 11, Reply to Objection 3), let alone the saints in heaven. This is the teaching of the Roman Catholic Church, although there are different opinions on the reasons for the impossibility to sin.

Impeccability and the Virgin Mary 

The Roman Catholic Church teaches that Mary, mother of Jesus was, by a special grace of God, without sin her entire life. This included the moment of her conception, so Mary was even miraculously preserved from original sin and its effects. 

The Immaculate Conception is a Roman Catholic dogma that asserts that Mary was preserved by God from the stain of original sin at the time of her own conception.  Some theologians have asserted this special grace extended to impeccability (understood in this context as the inability to sin); others argue this could not be so: as a natural human being, she would have had free will, and therefore the ability to sin, but through her co-operation avoided it.

Protestant  Christian theology holds that Jesus died for the sins of even his mother, who had at least two other sons, Jesus' brothers Jude and James.

Impeccability and the Pope 

Impeccability is sometimes confused with infallibility, especially in discussions of papal infallibility. Impeccability is an attribute not claimed by the pope, and few would deny that there have been bad popes – Saint Peter himself denied Jesus three times.  On the other hand, Pope Gregory VII, intellectual progenitor of the Ultramontanes and nemesis of the lay faction in the investiture controversy, voiced an assertion of Papal prerogative beyond even the strongest of modern apologists':

The pope can be judged by no one; the Roman church has never erred and never will err till the end of time; the Roman church was founded by Christ alone; the pope alone can depose and restore bishops; he alone can make new laws, set up new bishoprics and divide old ones. ...He alone can call general councils and authorize canon laws; his legates ... have precedence over all bishops. ...A duly ordained pope is undoubtedly made a saint by the merits of St. Peter.

Nevertheless, in Catholic thought, the exemption of the See of Rome from all error extends only to its definitive teachings on faith and morals, not to its historical judgments. Similarly, papal sainthood does not suggest that popes are free from sin. Quite the contrary, popes frequent the sacrament of Reconciliation (confession and penance) for the forgiveness of their sins, as all other Catholics are required to do. While occupying the papal office, Pope Benedict XVI confessed his sins once a week.

Protestant teaching
Evangelical writer Donald Macleod suggests that the sinless nature of Jesus Christ involves two elements.  "First, Christ was free of actual sin." Studying the gospels there is no reference to Jesus praying for the forgiveness of sin, nor confessing sin. The assertion is that Jesus did not commit sin, nor could he be proven guilty of sin; he had no vices. In fact, he is quoted as asking, "Can any of you prove me guilty of sin?" in John 8:46. "Secondly, he was free from inherent sin ("original sin" or "ancestral sin")."

Pelagianism
According to Pelagianism, sin arises from free choice rather than being an inevitable consequence of man's fallen nature. Therefore, it is theoretically possible, although unusual, for anyone to live a sinless life.

See also
Christian perfection
Gnomic will
Infallibility of the Church
Monothelitism

References

Catechism of the Catholic Church

Summa Theologica

External links
Catechism of the Catholic Church from the official website of the Vatican
Summa Theologica from NewAdvent website

Christian hamartiology
Christian terminology
Marian dogmas
Attributes of God in Christian theology
Nature of Jesus Christ